Yuri Ovchinnikov may refer to:
 Yuri Ovchinnikov (biochemist) (1934–1988), Soviet bioorganic chemist
 Yuri Ovchinnikov (figure skater) (born 1950), Russian figure skater